Clopton, Virginia may refer to:
Clopton, Gloucester County, Virginia
Clopton, Richmond County, Virginia